The Regiment "Lancieri di Milano" (7th) ( - "Lancers of Milan") is an inactive cavalry unit of the Italian Army.

History

Formation 
After the Second Italian War of Independence the Royal Sardinian Army formed three new Chevau-légers regiments on 16 September 1859: Regiment "Cavalleggeri di Milano", Regiment "Cavalleggeri di Montebello", and Regiment "Cavalleggeri di Lodi". The "Cavalleggeri di Milano" was formed in Vercelli, with three squadrons transferred from the Regiment "Piemonte Reale Cavalleria", Regiment "Savoia Cavalleria", and Regiment "Genova Cavalleria".

On 6 June 1860 the regiment was reorganized as a lancer regiment and renamed Regiment "Lancieri di Milano". In fall of the same year the regiment participated in the Sardinian campaign in central and southern Italy, during which the regiment was awarded a Bronze Medal of Military Valour having charged a column of papal troops at Senigallia. On 18 September 1860 the regiment fought in the Battle of Castelfidardo and from 5 November 1860 to 13 February 1861 it participated in the Siege of Gaeta. In 1861-63 the regiment operated in Apulia to suppress the anti-Sardinian revolt in Southern Italy after the Kingdom of Sardinia had invaded and annexed the Kingdom of Two Sicilies.

In 1866 the regiment participated in the Third Italian War of Independence and in 1870 in the capture of Rome. Over the next years the regiment repeatedly changed its name:

 10 September 1871: 7th Regiment of Cavalry (Milano)
 5 November 1876: Cavalry Regiment "Milano" (7th)
 16 December 1897: Regiment "Lancieri di Milano" (7th)

In 1887 the regiment contributed to the formation of the Mounted Hunters Squadron, which fought in the Italo-Ethiopian War of 1887–1889. In 1895-96 the regiment provided one officer and 74 enlisted for units deployed to Italian Eritrea for the First Italo-Ethiopian War. In 1911-12 the regiment provided two officers and 100 enlisted to augment units fighting in the Italo-Turkish War. Between the its founding and World War I the Milano ceded on two occasions one of its squadrons to help form new Lancer regiments:

 16 February 1864: Regiment "Lancieri di Foggia" (later renamed: Regiment "Cavalleggeri di Foggia" 11th))
 1 October 1909: Regiment "Lancieri di Vercelli" (26th)

World War I 
At the outbreak of World War I the regiment consisted of a command, the regimental depot, and two cavalry groups, with the I Group consisting of three squadrons and the II Group consisting of two squadrons and a machine gun section. Together with the Regiment "Lancieri Vittorio Emanuele II" (10th) the Milano formed the III Cavalry Brigade of the 2nd Cavalry Division of "Veneto". The division fought dismounted in the trenches of the Italian Front, where the regiment distinguished itself on 19 June 1918 during the Battle of Monastier, for which it was awarded its second Bronze Medal of Military Valour. In 1917 the regimental depot in Padua formed the 854th Dismounted Machine Gunners Company as reinforcement for infantry units on the front.

Interwar years 
After the war the Italian Army disbanded 14 of its 30 cavalry regiments and so on 21 November 1919 the II Group of the Milano was renamed "Cavalleggeri di Roma" as it consisted of personnel and horses from the disbanded Regiment "Cavalleggeri di Roma" (20th). On 20 May 1920 the regiment was disbanded and its two squadrons transferred to the Regiment "Genova Cavalleria" (4th), respectively the Regiment "Lancieri di Aosta" (6th), while the former 3rd Squadron of the "Cavalleggeri di Roma" was transferred to the Regiment "Lancieri di Novara" (5th). The traditions of the "Lancieri di Milano" were assigned to the Regiment "Cavalleggeri Guide" (19th).

World War II 
On 14 March 1938 the unit was reformed in Civitavecchia with the function of Fast Troops Central School and the name Regiment "Lancieri di Milano". The regiment consisted of a command, a command squadron, one squadrons group, a machine gunners platoon, and a fast tanks platoon.

In 1940 the regiment ended its function as central school and moved to annexed Albania, where it integrated a squadrons groups with Albanian personnel. By October 1940 the regiment consisted of a command, a command squadron, the I and II squadrons groups, each with two mounted squadrons, and the 5th Machine Gunners Squadron. The Milano, together with the Regiment "Lancieri di Aosta" (6th), Regiment "Cavalleggeri Guide" (19th), and 3rd Regiment "Granatieri di Sardegna e d'Albania", formed the Littoral Grouping on the extreme right during the initial stages of the Italian invasion of Greece. During winter 1940-41 the regiment fought on the Greek front and in April 1941 the regiment participated in the Invasion of Yugoslavia. For its conduct during the Yugoslav campaign the regiment was awarded a War Cross of Military Valour. Afterwards the regiment remained on anti-partisan duty in Albania, Croatia and occupied Greece. In March 1942 the regiment was reinforced with a squadron detached from the Regiment "Lancieri Vittorio Emanuele II". The regiment dissolved in Larissa in Greece after the announcement of the Armistice of Cassibile on 8 September 1943.

Cold War 
On 1 September 1964 the Squadrons Group "Lancieri di Milano" was formed in Monza and assigned to the Infantry Division "Legnano" as divisional reconnaissance unit.

During the 1975 army reform the army disbanded the regimental level and newly independent battalions were granted for the first time their own flags. On 1 August 1975 the squadrons group was renamed 7th Reconnaissance Squadrons Group "Lancieri di Milano" and assigned the flag and traditions of the Regiment "Lancieri di Milano" (7th). The squadrons group consisted of a command, a command and services squadron, and three reconnaissance squadrons equipped with Fiat Campagnola reconnaissance vehicles, M113 armored personnel carriers, and M47 Patton tanks. The same year the Milano moved from Monza to Remanzacco, where it joined the Mechanized Division "Mantova" as divisional reconnaissance unit.

For its conduct and work after the 1976 Friuli earthquake the squadrons group was awarded a Bronze Medal of Army Valour, which was affixed to the squadrons group's flag and added to its coat of arms.

In 1980 the Milano began to replace its M47 Patton tanks with Leopard 1A2 main battle tanks. In 1986 the Italian Army disbanded the divisional level and placed brigades under direct command of its Army Corps. With the Mantova scheduled to disband the 7th Reconnaissance Squadrons Group "Lancieri di Milano" was transferred to the Armored Brigade "Pozzuolo del Friuli".

After the end of the Cold War the Italian Army began to draw down its forces and one of the first units to disband was the "Lancieri di Milano" on 10 December 1989. On 15 December the regiment's flag was transferred to the Shrine of the Flags in the Vittoriano in Rome.

See also 
 Cavalry Brigade "Pozzuolo del Friuli"

References

Cavalry Regiments of Italy